Fissurellidea is a genus of sea snails, marine gastropod mollusks in the subfamily Diodorinae  of the family Fissurellidae, the keyhole limpets.

Species
Species within the genus Fissurellidea include:
 Fissurellidea bimaculata Dall, 1871
 Fissurellidea genevievae Dautzenberg, 1929
 Fissurellidea megatrema d'Orbigny, 1839
 Fissurellidea patagonica (Strebel, 1907)
Species brought into synonymy
 Fissurellidea annulus Odhner, 1932: synonym of Pupillaea annulus (Odhner, 1932)
 Fissurellidea aperta (Sowerby, 1825): synonym of Pupillaea aperta (Sowerby, 1825)
 Fissurellidea genevievae Dautzenberg, 1929: synonym of Medusafissurella dubia (L. Reeve, 1849)
 Fissurellidea incarnata (Krauss, 1848): synonym of Dendrofissurella scutellum hiantula (Lamarck, 1822)
 Fissurellidea multilineata W. H. Turton, 1932: synonym of Dendrofissurella scutellum hiantula (Lamarck, 1822) (junior synonym)
 Fissurellidea nigrostrigata W. H. Turton, 1932: synonym of Dendrofissurella scutellum hiantula (Lamarck, 1822) (junior synonym)
 Fissurellidea sella G. B. Sowerby II, 1862: synonym of Dendrofissurella scutellum scutellum (Gmelin, 1791)

References

 McLean J.H. (1984) Shell reduction and loss in fissurellids: A review of genera and species in the Fissurellidea group. American Malacological Bulletin 2: 21-34

External links
 Orbigny, A. D. d'. (1834-1847). Voyage dans l'Amérique méridionale [... exécuté pendant les années 1826, 1827, 1828, 1829, 1830, 1831, 1832 et 1833. Tome 5(3) Mollusques. pp. i-xliii, 1-758, 85 plates [Dates after Coan & Kabat (2015, 2400 Years of Malacology, Appendix 1: 21-23.) Pls 1-2, 1834; pp. 1–104, pls 3-7, 10, 12, 1835; pp. 105–184, pls 8-9, 11, 13-23, 25-28, 1836; pls 24, 29-43, 41bis, 45-46, 1837; pp. 185–376, pls 44, 47-52, 55, 1838; pls 54, 56-65, 1839; pl. 66, 1840; pp. 377–488, pls 53, 67-77, 80, 1841; pp. 489–758, 1846; pls 78-79, 81-85, 1847 ]

Fissurellidae